The 1984 St Albans City and District Council election took place on 3 May 1984 to elect members of St Albans City and District Council in England. This was on the same day as other local elections.

Following the election, the council fell into No overall control, with the Conservatives forming the largest group.

Summary

Ward results

Ashley

Batchwood

Clarence

Colney Heath

Cunningham

Harpenden East

 
 

 

No Independent candidate as previous (25.0%).

Harpenden North

Harpenden South

Harpenden West

London Colney

 

 

No Alliance candidate as previous (13.8%).

Marshallwick North

Marshallwick South

Park Street

Redbourn

 
 

 

No Alliance candidate as previous (32.0%).

Sopwell

St. Peters

St. Stephens

Verulam

Wheathampstead

References

St Albans
St Albans City and District Council elections
1980s in Hertfordshire